is a Japanese video game composer and sound director who is best known for his various compositions in many Nintendo games. He occasionally does voice acting as well, most notably voicing Yoshi from the Mario series. He also directed the development of Wii Music.

Works

Characters portrayed
Totaka has portrayed several characters for Nintendo games. He mostly voices Yoshi (first appearing in Super Mario World), but he also voices, Professor E. Gadd, Captain Olimar, Birdo, and K.K. Slider, as well as portraying Shy Guy from 1997 to 2002.

K.K. Slider
The character K.K. Slider in Animal Crossing is named Totakeke (とたけけ) in the Japanese version. This name could be derived from how Totaka's name is said in Japanese (Totaka K.) as last names usually come before personal names in the language. Totakeke is said to be an animal version caricature of Totaka.

At the Mario & Zelda Big Band Live concert, some fans shouted "Totakeke" while the host grabbed a guitar and gave it to Totaka. Totaka then sat down on a chair like K.K. Slider while Shigeru Miyamoto held a picture of K.K. Slider next to Totaka.

Totaka's Song

"Totaka's Song" is a short, 19-note tune hidden in almost every game Totaka has written music for as an easter egg. It was first discovered on the title screen of Mario Paint and was later discovered as having originated in the Game Boy game X, which predated Mario Paint by two months.

References

External links
Kazumi Totaka's Song at NinDB

1967 births
Japanese composers
Japanese male composers
Japanese male video game actors
Japanese male voice actors
Living people
Musicians from Tokyo
Nintendo people
Video game composers